St Helen's Priory may refer to:

 St Helen's Priory, Derby
 St Helen's Priory, Isle of Wight